Tragic Illusion 25 (The Rarities) is a compilation album by gothic metal band Paradise Lost. It was released on 5 November 2013 through Century Media. The compilation album contains a previously unreleased track "Loneliness Remains" as well as two cover tracks, two remixes, and two re-recordings.

Track listing

Credits

Paradise Lost
Nick Holmes – vocals
 Greg Mackintosh  – lead guitars
 Aaron Aedy – rhythm guitar
 Steve Edmondson – bass guitar
Adrian Erlandsson -  drums (1-4, 13, 14)

Additional musicians
Peter Damin - drums (5-8)
 Jeff Singer – drums (9-12)

Charts

References

2013 albums
Paradise Lost (band) albums
Century Media Records albums